The 1960 United States Senate election in Montana took place on November 8, 1960. Incumbent United States Senator James E. Murray, who was first elected to the Senate in a special election in 1934 and was re-elected in 1936, 1942, and 1948, and 1954, declined to seek re-election, creating an open seat. United States Congressman Lee Metcalf won out in a crowded Democratic primary and faced off against former United States Congressman Orvin B. Fjare, who won in a similarly-crowded Republican primary. Following a close general election, Metcalf narrowly defeated Fjare to win his first term in the Senate.

Democratic primary

Candidates
Lee Metcalf, United States Congressman from Montana's 1st congressional district
John W. Bonner, former Governor of Montana
LeRoy H. Anderson, United States Congressman from Montana's 2nd congressional district
John W. Mahan, former National Commander of the Veterans of Foreign Wars

Results

Republican primary

Candidates
Orvin B. Fjare, former United States Congressman from Montana's 2nd congressional district
Sumner Gerard, State Representative
Wayne Montgomery, rancher
James H. Morrow
Fred J. Martin
L. A. Wilson

Results

General election

Results

References

Montana
1960
1960 Montana elections